Lagavulin ("hollow of the mill") is a small village approximately  outside Port Ellen on the Isle of Islay, Scotland. The village is within the parish of Kildalton, and is situated on the A846 road.

It is best known for being the home of Lagavulin single malt whisky.

References

External links

Canmore - Islay, Lagavulin, Standing Stone site record
Canmore - Islay, Lagavulin, An Dunan site record
Canmore - Islay, Lagavulin, Barr An T-Seann Duine site record
Canmore - Islay, Achnancarranan site record

Villages in Islay